{{safesubst:#invoke:RfD||2=Dennis Rogers|month = February
|day =  1
|year = 2023
|time = 01:27
|timestamp = 20230201012705

|content=
REDIRECT Denis Rogers

}}
Dennis Rogers may refer to the following people:
Dennis Rogers, manager of the Vancouver Canadians in 2003, 2004, and 2006
Dennis Rogers, columnist in Barbecue in North Carolina and Lexington Barbecue Festival
Dennis Rogers, strongman & arm wrestler, see 
Dennis Rogers, an outreach pastor who took Jay "Saint" Smith under his wing
Dennis Rogers, United States Marine Corps Brigadier General, in Kemper Military School
The Dennis Rogers Show (2007), Roger Rohatgi, lead actor
Dennis Rogers, fictional British Intelligence agent in James Bond 007: Light of My Death

See also 
Denis Rogers, New Zealand doctor and politician